This is a list of monuments in Bhojpur District, Nepal as officially recognized by and available through the website of the Department of Archaeology, Nepal. Bhojpur is a district of Province No. 1 and is located in eastern Nepal. Hindu temples are the main attraction of this district.

List of monuments

|}

See also 
 List of monuments in Province No. 1
 List of monuments in Nepal

References 

Bhojpur